Strawn Independent School District is a public school district based in Strawn, Texas (USA).

The district consists of one campus consisting of grades PK-12.

Strawn High School has won five UIL six-man football championships. (2003, 2008, 2017, 2018, and 2021. The 2008 title was in Division I).

Academic achievement
In 2009, the school district was rated "academically acceptable" by the Texas Education Agency.

Special programs

Athletics
Strawn High School plays six-man football.

The documentary Texas 6 documents the sports team. It has a total of eight episodes and was placed on CBS All Access.

See also

List of school districts in Texas 
List of high schools in Texas

References

External links
 Strawn ISD

School districts in Palo Pinto County, Texas
School districts in Erath County, Texas